This surname Brine may have the following origins. The first is that it is a variant of Bryan. The second is that it is a variant of Browne. However, other sources suggest it's from the Anglo-Saxon word bryne meaning "burning".

The surname may refer to:

Augustus Brine (1769–1840), English naval officer
Beverly Brine (b. 1961), Canadian politician 
Cyril Brine (1914–1988), English speedway racer
David Brine (b. 1985), Canadian ice hockey player
James Brine (d. 1902), one of the Tolpuddle Martyrs
John Brine (1703–1765), English Baptist minister
George Brine, the namesake of the George Brine House
Salty Brine (1918–2004), Walter L. Brine Jr., American broadcaster
Steve Brine (b. 1974), British politician

References